Fort Pitt may refer to:

Saskatchewan, Canada
Fort Pitt Farms Christian Community, Hutterite group
Battle of Fort Pitt, during the 1885 North-West Rebellion
Fort Pitt Provincial Park, named after a Hudson's Bay Company trading post, now National Historic Site

Kent, England
Fort Pitt Grammar School
Fort Pitt, Kent, Napoleonic-era fort

Pittsburgh, Pennsylvania, USA
Fort Pitt (Pennsylvania), on the site of present-day Pittsburgh
Fort Pitt (Amtrak), former train operated between Pittsburgh and Altoona
Fort Pitt Blockhouse, a structure built in support of Fort Pitt
Fort Pitt Boulevard
Fort Pitt Brewing Company, active 1906 to 1957
Fort Pitt Bridge
Fort Pitt Elementary School
Fort Pitt Foundry, historic armory
Fort Pitt Hornets, former ice hockey team
Fort Pitt Incline, former funicular railroad
Fort Pitt Museum
Fort Pitt Regiment, soccer club
Siege of Fort Pitt, in 1763 during Pontiac's War
Treaty of Fort Pitt, 1778, between the United States and the Lenape people
Fort Pitt Tunnel